Alaquines is a municipality and town in the Mexican state of San Luis Potosí. It is 19 km away from Cárdenas.

Climate

History
Founded in 1616 with the old name of San José de los Montes Alaquines. It is home to a legend which tells of its saint's wish (Santo Entierro) stay in this colorful town.

Recently
The City of Alaquines agreed to fix the road from Alaquines to San Jose del Corito that will be completed in 2009.

Communities
The town's population is divided into 10 communities, which are listed as follows:

 Colonia Indigena
 Las Tuzas
 Rancho de Pro
 Los Morales
 La Cañada
 Martínez
 Rancho Nuevo
 Maldonado
 Las Huertas
 El Pasito de San Francisco
 El Sabino
 San José del Corito
 San José de Palmas

Mayors of Alaquines
 Ignacio Federico Infante Martínez (1971–1973)
 Pedro Rodarte Rodríguez (1974–1976)
 Delfino Aguilar Reynaga (1977–1979)
 Abdenago Chávez Mendiola (1980–1982)
 Carlos Saldierna Vázquez (1983–1985)
 Salomón Montalbán U. (1986–1988)
 Tomás Aguilar I. (1992–1994)
 Alberto Castillo P. (1995–1997)
 Abdenango Chávez Mendiola (1997–2000)
 Bonifacio Carreón Moctezuma (2000–2003)
 J. Isabel Ruíz Cedillo (2004–2006)
 María Leonides Secaida López (2006–2009)
 Manuel Lara Barcenas (2009-2012)
 Ciriaco Carreon Rucoba (2013-2016)

References

Populated places in San Luis Potosí